Tangier has been the subject of many artistic works, including novels, films and music.

Literature

 Tanger: A Norwegian book by the author Thure Erik Lund. Jostein Bøhn, one of the main characters has it as a final destination point in his journey.
 Le dernier ami by Tahar Ben Jelloun. The two protagonists were born in Tangier and the city is revisited many times in the book.
 Jour de silence à Tanger by Tahar Ben Jelloun.
 "Streetwise" by Mohamed Choukri
 Naked Lunch by William S. Burroughs – relates some of the author's experiences in Tangier. (See also Naked Lunch (film))
 The poem "America" by Allen Ginsberg
 Desolation Angels by Jack Kerouac relates him living with William Burroughs and other Beat writers in Tangier.
 Interzone by Burroughs – It talks about a fictionalized version of Tangier as an international city called Interzone (aka International Zone)
 Let It Come Down is Paul Bowles's second novel, first published in 1952
 Two Tickets for Tangier by Francis Van Wyck Mason, an American novelist and historian
 Modesty Blaise; a fictional character in a comic strip of the same name and a series of books created by Peter O'Donnell – In 1945 a nameless girl escaped from a displaced person (DP) camp in Karylos, Greece. She took control of a criminal gang in Tangier and expanded it to international status as "The Network". After dissolving The Network and moving to England she maintained a house on a hillside above Tangier and many scenes in the books and comic strips are located here.
 Carpenter's World Travels: From Tangier to Tripoli – a Frank G. Carpenter travel guide (1927)
 The Thief's Journal by Jean Genet – Includes the protagonist's experiments in negative morality in Tangier (1949)
 The Alchemist by Paulo Coelho
  The Crossroads of the Mediterranean by Hendrik de Leeuw chronicles the author's journey through Morocco and Tunisia in the early 1950s and includes many pages describing Tangier, notably the Petit Socco as a food market with mountain dwellers (the jebli) selling their produce and 'the street of male harlots', where they ply 'their shameful trade'.
 The Gold Bug Variations by Richard Powers
 The Innocents Abroad by Mark Twain includes a mixed bag of comments on his visit to Tangier, ending with: "I would seriously recommend to the Government of the United States that when a man commits a crime so heinous that the law provides no adequate punishment for it, they make him Consul-General to Tangier."
 Seed by Mustafa Mutabaruka – An African-American dancer struggling with the death of his father meets an enigmatic young woman and her companion in Tangier.
 Au grand socco by Joseph Kessel – A Moroccan Tangerine boy shares his adventures in the Grand Socco.
 A Dead Man in Tangier by Michael Pearce – Sandor Seymour, an officer of Scotland Yard's Special Branch, is sent to investigate a murdered diplomat in Tangier, during the era immediately preceding World War I.
 Tangier by William Bayer – a novel of expatriate life set in Tangier in the 1970s, featuring a Moroccan detective who watches the foreign colony and a host of writers, painters and socialites believed to have been based on real Tangier personalities.
 The Drifters by James A Michener – a novel which follows six young characters from diverse backgrounds and various countries as their paths meet and they travel together through parts of Spain, Portugal, Morocco and Mozambique.
 Enderby Outside and The Clockwork Testament, or Enderby's End by Anthony Burgess – Partially takes place in Tangier, where the main character is given a bar by his enemy, Rawcliffe.
 Dark Voyage by Alan Furst - World War II naval intrigue, partly set in Tangier.
 The Strange Land, by Hammond Innes. Adventure/thriller novel set at first in Tangier, and then mainly in the south of Morocco.

Magazines
 Antaeus (magazine) was first published in Tangier by Daniel Halpern and Paul Bowles before being shifted to New York City
 Tangier Gazette was founded by William Augustus Bird (aka Bill Bird) in Tangier

Films and television
 Tangier American film featuring María Montez, Robert Paige and Sabu – 1946
Mission in Tangier (French: Mission à Tanger) a 1949 French drama film directed by André Hunebelle and starring Raymond Rouleau, Gaby Sylvia and Mila Parély.
 My Favorite Spy, Bob Hope and Hedy Lamarr spy comedy set mainly in Tangier – 1951
 Flight to Tangier (Charles Marquis Warren) – 1953
 Tangier Incident (1953) – an American agent posing as a black market operator, is in Tangier on a mission to stop the plans of three atomic scientists who are there to pool their secrets and sell them in a package to the Communists.
 That Man from Tangier (in Spanish Aquel Hombre de Tanger) featuring Sara Montiel – 1953
 Tangier, an episode of the television series Passport to Danger starring Cesar Romero – 1955
 Man from Tangier (a.k.a. Thunder Over Tangier) – 1957
 The Man in the Cage, an episode of the television series Thriller.  The episode stars Philip Carey. – 1961
 From Russia with Love (1963) – the villain, Donald "Red" Grant, was recruited by "SPECTRE" in Tangier in 1962, whilst on the run from the law
 Espionage in Tangier.  A thriller of a secret agent out to snag a dangerous molecular ray-gun – 1965
 Requiem for a Secret Agent (1966), Italian spy thriller shot in Tangier and Marrakesh
 The Man from U.N.C.L.E. episode The "J" for Judas Affair – 1967
 The Nautch of Tangier (aka The Witchmaker) – 1969
 The Wind and the Lion (1975) – Based on the Perdicaris incident of 1904, this film, starring Sean Connery, Candice Bergen, and Brian Keith, takes place largely in Tangier. The film's Tangier, however, was actually created in the Spanish cities of Seville and Almeria.
 Tangier (1982), spy thriller with Ronny Cox and Billie Whitelaw
 The Living Daylights (1987) – a James Bond movie where he hunts Brad Whitaker down at his Tangier headquarters
 Prick Up Your Ears (1987) – Joe Orton (Gary Oldman) and Kenneth Halliwell (Alfred Molina) visit Tangier, the scene represents the 88-day holiday that Joe Orton took after the failure of his play Loot
 The Sheltering Sky, starring John Malkovich and Debra Winger. Bernardo Bertolucci's adaptation of the novel by Paul Bowles.  Married American artists Port and Kit Moresby travel aimlessly through North Africa, searching for new experiences that could give sense to their relationship. But the flight to distant regions only leads both deeper into despair. – 1990
 Tangiers, July 1909, segment of Young Indiana Jones Chronicles episodes edited into 1992 episode "Young Indiana Jones and the Curse of the Jackal"
 Casino (1995), a movie directed by Martin Scorsese depicts the mainstay casino as 'Tangiers' . The movie stars Joe Pesci and Robert De Niro
 The Bourne Ultimatum, an espionage movie featuring Matt Damon – Jason Bourne tracks a man through the city who has information on his (Bourne's) past. – 2007
 Inception featuring Leonardo DiCaprio – 2010: The city was used to film the scenes set in Mombasa, Kenya
Agent Vinod (2012 film), an Indian spy action film by Sriram Raghavan. Set in Tangier and other locations in Morocco.* Archer – the title character Sterling Archer is revealed to have been born in Tangier, where his valet and caretaker Woodhouse once owned a bar; season 4 episode 10, Un Chien Tangerine (March 2013), takes place in Tangier.
 Archer – the title character Sterling Archer is revealed to have been born in Tangier, where his valet and caretaker Woodhouse once owned a bar; season 4 episode 10, Un Chien Tangerine (March 2013), takes place in Tangier.
 Only Lovers Left Alive (2013) – Tilda Swinton's character, Eve, lives in Tangier.
El tiempo entre costuras (The Time in Between), Spanish period drama television series, has scenes set in Tangier –  2013
 SPECTRE (2015): James Bond visits a hotel named L'American.
 In 2016, in the penultimate episode of Downton Abbey, it is revealed that Bertie Hexham's cousin, the Marquess of Hexham, died in Tangiers, leaving Bertie to be the new Marquess of Hexham.
 In 2021, in the first episode of the rebooted The Equalizer series, the title character (played by Queen Latifah) plans around a rescue tactic that she and her CIA contact utilized in Tangier.

Music
 Tangier – American hard rock band.
 Tangiers – a Canadian rock music band.
 "If You See Her, Say Hello" by Bob Dylan on his Blood On The Tracks album – The song's opening line is, "If you see her say 'hello', she might be in Tangier."
 Sartori in Tangier by King Crimson – derives its title from Beat generation influences including the Jack Kerouac novel Satori in Paris, and the city of Tangier, where a number of Beat writers resided and which they often used as a setting for their writing.
 "Waiting in Tangier" – a track in the album Woman to Woman of Fem2fem band.
 "Tangier" by the Scottish musician Donovan on his album The Hurdy Gurdy Man.
 Live at Tangiers – a solo by Michael Stanley
 "Tangiers" – an instrumental piece by John Powell featured in The Bourne Ultimatum
 My Tangier – Dave Crockett (circa 1980s)
 Intrigue in Tangiers – a track from the album What Does Anything Mean? Basically by The Chameleons.
 Idaho by Josh Ritter – "I got your letter in Tangier".
 Guantanamo by Outlandish Or we can lounge in Tangier – Not the one in Vegas, naah the one in Maroc
 Tangiers by Billy Thorpe – a concept album about Tangier, inspired by Thorpe's several visits there.
 Night Train by Looptroop – a song about travelling by night train and noticing diffidences caused by time, place and circumstances; Promoe's singing about his trip around Morocco "I'm on the night train from Tangier to Marrakesh"
 Hacker by Death Grips – First line of the song is "Going back to Tangier, with some Jordans and a Spear"
 "Intrigue in Tangiers"  English band featuring Roger Hill & Mel Jones. Since 2008 "Intrigue in Tangiers" have released 9 studio albums, 2 live albums and a "best of".
 Style by Taylor Swift – the popular tourist attraction Caves of Hercules, located in Tangier, is shown on the music video of the 2015 hit song by Taylor Swift.
 Shock Treatment, the title song from the Richard O'Brien musical of the same name - "I'm not a loco with motive to suture myself/I've been a cynic for too many years/Playing doctor and nurse, it can be good for your health/I've seen clinics with those gimmicks in Tangiers."

Paintings
 HMS Mary Rose and pirates by Willem van de Velde (a painting ascribed to Willem van de Velde, taken from the book: William Laird Clowes (ed.): The Royal Navy. A History From the Earliest Times to the Present, Vol. 2, London 1898)
 Market Day Outside the Walls of Tangiers by Louis Comfort Tiffany (1873 – Smithsonian American Art Museum)
 Harvest of a journey to Spain and Tangiers, The Great Mosque, and Serpent Charmers of Sokko – a painting by Emile Wauters (c. 1911–1916)
 Window at Tangier by the French artist Henri Matisse (1912 – The Pushkin Museum of Fine Arts, Moscow).
 Virtual Tangier: Visions of the City by Matisse (1913)

Radio
 "A Ticket to Tangiers" is an episode of The Adventures of Harry Lime

Popular culture, in
Cities in popular culture
Tangier in fiction